Denis Lamothe is a Canadian politician, who was elected to the National Assembly of Quebec in the 2018 provincial election. He represents the electoral district of Ungava as a member of the Coalition Avenir Québec.

A former Sûreté du Québec officer in Kuujjuaq and Kuujjuaraapik, he promised in his campaign to be an advocate for greater self-determination rights for the Nunavik region of Quebec.

Electoral record

References

Living people
Coalition Avenir Québec MNAs
21st-century Canadian politicians
People from Chibougamau
Canadian police officers
Year of birth missing (living people)